Christen Friis (1581–1639) was a Danish nobleman, politician, and patron of arts and science.

He was a son of Jørgen Friis and Else Bjørn, and a nephew of Johan Friis, from whom he inherited Borreby Castle. He inherited the manor of Kragerup in 1610. He bought Lindholm manor in 1633.

Christen Friis was Chancellor of Denmark from 1616.  Friis was an opponent of the continuation of the Kalmar War and advocated peace measures to Christian IV of Denmark.

He was a patron of the astronomer Christen Sørensen Longomontanus and the historians Johannes Pontanus and Johannes Meursius, and a friend of the natural historian Ole Worm.

He married Barbara Wittrup (d. 1653). Their children included Hans Friis.

He died in 1639.

References

External links
 History of Lindholm manor (Danish)
 Engraving of 'Christen Friis' by Simon van der Passe, British Museum
 Epitaph and tomb of Christen Friis

1581 births
1639 deaths
16th-century Danish nobility
16th-century Danish politicians
16th-century Danish landowners
17th-century Danish nobility
17th-century Danish politicians
17th-century Danish landowners
People of the Kalmar War